Griffith Jones (born Harold Jones; 19 November 1909 – 30 January 2007) was an English film, stage and television actor.

Early life
Born in Notting Hill, London, on 19 November 1909, Jones was the 5th child of William Thomas Jones and Harriet Eleanor J. Doughty (1878–1973), a Welsh-speaking dairy owner. 

In 1930, he was studying law at University College London when Kenneth Barnes, the Principal of the Royal Academy of Dramatic Art, noticed him in a student performance and offered him a career as an actor. His first professional engagement was in Carpet Slippers at the Embassy Theatre, Swiss Cottage, in 1930, while still at RADA. He won the annual RADA Gold Medal in 1932.

Career
His first West End production was Vile Bodies at the Vaudeville and Richard of Bordeaux (in which he appeared with John Gielgud) at the New Theatre. The following year he appeared with Laurence Olivier in The Rats of Norway. In 1932 he made his film debut, in The Faithful Heart, and he continued to appear in British films throughout the 1930s. He achieved success on the London stage and on Broadway as "Caryl Sanger" in the play, Escape Me Never, with Elizabeth Bergner, and also starred with her in the 1935 film version.

In 1940 he joined the British Army, but spent most of the Second World War in a touring concert party, returning to the West End in 1945 to star in Lady Windermere's Fan. He then became a fairly big star of the British cinema in the late 1940s, showing a particular talent for comedies. He was the leading man in a number of films, including Miranda (1948), opposite Glynis Johns and Googie Withers, and Once Upon a Dream (1949), opposite Withers again. He was mainly seen in supporting roles from the mid-1950s onwards, among the most prominent being in the film The Sea Shall Not Have Them (1954). He still played occasional lead roles, notably as a man who is framed for murder in The Scarlet Web (1954) and as a husband who tries to have his wife murdered in the crime thriller Kill Her Gently (1957).

Royal Shakespeare Company
He was a stalwart of the Royal Shakespeare Company, appearing in 50 productions with the company between 1975 and 1999.

His first season was in director Buzz Goodbody's noted opening year at The Other Place theatre, playing the Ghost to Ben Kingsley's Hamlet and Sir William Stanley in Perkin Warbeck. His later roles included Duncan, opposite Ian McKellen, in Macbeth, Antigonus in The Winter's Tale, Aegeon in A Comedy of Errors, Gower in Pericles, Prince of Tyre, The Comedy of Errors, Chebutiken and Ferrapont in separate productions of Chekhov's Three Sisters and Tim Linkinwater and Fluggers in Nicholas Nickleby.

His last role, at the age of 90, was Tubal in The Merchant of Venice.

Personal life and death
Jones was married to actress Irene Isaac (known as "Robin") from 1932 until her death in 1985. They had two children, who both became actors: Gemma Jones (who was named after the main character in Escape Me Never) and Nicholas Jones.

Jones died in his sleep from natural causes at his home in London, England, on 30 January 2007 aged 97.

Selected filmography

 The Faithful Heart (1932) - (uncredited)
 Money Talks (1932) - Jimmy Dale, the Kid's rival
 The Rise of Catherine the Great (1934) - Grigory Orlov
 Leave It to Blanche (1934) - Philip Amesbury
 Escape Me Never (1935) - Caryl Sanger
 First a Girl (1935) - Robert
 Line Engaged (1935) - Minor Role (uncredited)
 The Mill on the Floss (1936) - Stephen Guest
 The Wife of General Ling (1937) - John Fenton
 Return of a Stranger (1937) - James Martin
 A Yank at Oxford (1938) - Paul Beaumont
 The Four Just Men (1939) - James Brodie
 Young Man's Fancy (1939) - Lord Alban
 Atlantic Ferry (1941) - David MacIver
 This Was Paris (1942) - Capt. Bill Hamilton, MI5
 The Day Will Dawn (1942) - Police Inspector Gunter
 Uncensored (1942) - Father de Gruyte
 Henry V (1944) - Earl of Salisbury
 The Wicked Lady (1945) - Sir Ralph
 The Rake's Progress (1945) - Sandy Duncan
 They Made Me a Fugitive (1947) - Narcy
 Miranda (1948) - Dr. Paul Martin
 Good-Time Girl (1948) - Danny Martin
 Look Before You Love (1948) - Charles Kent
 Once Upon a Dream (1949) - Jackson
 Honeymoon Deferred (1951) - David Fry
 Star of My Night (1954) - Michael Donovan
 The Scarlet Web (1954) - Jake Winter
 The Sea Shall Not Have Them (1954) - Group Capt. Todd
 Face in the Night (1957) - Rapson
 Account Rendered (1957) - Robert Ainsworth
 The Truth About Women (1957) - Sir Jeremy
 Not Wanted on Voyage (1957) - Guy Harding
 Kill Her Gently (1957) - Jeff Martin
 Hidden Homicide (1959) - Michael Cornforth
 The Crowning Touch (1959) - Mark
 Strangler's Web (1965) - Jackson Delacorte
 Decline and Fall... of a Birdwatcher (1968) - Sir Humphrey Maltravers

Selected stage credits
 Gertie Maude by John Van Druten (1937)
 The Moonraker by Arthur Watkyn (1952)

References

Sources
Obituary in The Guardian
Performances with the RSC

External links
 

1909 births
2007 deaths
English male film actors
English male stage actors
English male television actors
Male actors from London
Royal Shakespeare Company members
Alumni of University College London
Alumni of RADA
English people of Welsh descent
20th-century English male actors
British Army personnel of World War II